Clubul Sportiv Municipal Corona Brașov, commonly known as Corona Brașov or simply as Corona, was a Romanian football club based in Brașov, Brașov County.

History
Corona managed to promote for the very first time in history to the Liga I in June 2013. It advanced from the Liga IV to the Liga I in only four years. Only FC Victoria Brănești succeeded to do so before. The participation in the first league was short-lived. Corona was relegated after only one season. In Liga I, Corona won only two games, against Ceahlăul Piatra Neamț and FC Vaslui. The team finished last, with only 14 points in 34 games, with the weakest attack and the weakest defense lines in the championship. Only days after the end of the season, the mayor of Brașov, George Scripcaru, announced that the football section of the club financed by the mayorship ended its activities.

The club was refounded in the summer of 2016, but it activated only at youth level until the summer of 2019, when the senior squad was refounded as CSM Corona Brașov.

In the summer of 2021, Corona promoted back to Liga II, but after promotion it was absorbed by FC Brașov (2021), in a merge process that also involved ACS Scotch Club. FC Brașov (2021) took Corona place in the second division.

Grounds
Until the promotion to the Liga I, Corona played its home matches on the Carpați Stadium but was forced to move from there because it didn't meet the requirements for top football. In the first division, the team shared the Silviu Ploeșteanu Stadium with FC Brașov. In 2016, the club moved again on the Carpați Stadium.

In 2020, Carpați Stadium was demolished and Corona Brașov moved back to Silviu Ploeșteanu Stadium.

Honours
Liga II:
Winners (1): 2012–13

Liga III:
Winners (2): 2011–12, 2020–21

Liga IV – Brașov County:
Winners (2): 2009–10, 2019–20

League history

Notable former players
The footballers enlisted below have had international cap(s) for their respective countries at junior and/or senior level and/or more than 50 caps for CSM Corona Brașov.

  Valentin Balint
  Sergiu Buș
  Răzvan Damian
  Wilfried Kanon
  Alexandru Marc
  Alexandru Tudose

Managers
 Daniel Bona (July 1, 2009 – June 20, 2013)
 Nicolae Manea (June 20, 2013 – September 2, 2013)
 Ionel Gane (September 2, 2013 – April 14, 2014)
 Adrian Hârlab (April 14, 2014 – May 5, 2014)
 Daniel Bona (May 5, 2014 – May 23, 2014)

References

External links

Defunct football clubs in Romania
Football clubs in Brașov County
Association football clubs established in 2009
Association football clubs disestablished in 2021
Liga I clubs
Liga II clubs
Liga III clubs
Liga IV clubs
2009 establishments in Romania
2021 disestablishments in Romania